The Mallow–Tralee line runs from  to Tralee Casement.

A peculiar arrangement at Killarney is in place, in which trains from Mallow enter Killarney, which is a dead-end. Trains continuing to Tralee then have to reverse until they reach the junction, before changing direction again to continue westwards.

The line from Mallow to Killarney was noted for severe gradients compared to the line from Dublin to Mallow though the Killarney expresses of 1899 were timed to achieve the section at  westbound and  eastbound.

History
The Tralee & Killarney Railway opened the extension from Killarney junction to Tralee in 1859. The Great Southern and Western Railway (GS&WR) who had invested in both companies absorbed them both in 1860.

At Tralee there were small sidings that were convenient to those of the narrow gauge Tralee and Dingle Light Railway. There was also links beyond the road to the marshalling yards, the branch to Fenit, and the Limerick–Tralee line.

Rolling stock
Alexander McDonnell GS&WR Class 2 Kerry bogies were specifically intended for passenger services on the line.  There was a trial of a Drumm Battery Train with temporary charging points set up on the line during the late 1930s or 1940s. 22000 Class ICR railcars first began passenger services on the line in September 2008.

Branches

Castleisland
It closed in 1974. Alexander McDonnell designed a combined engine and carriage, the GS&WR Class 90, to work the branch.

Kenmare
It closed on 1 February 1960.

Newmarket
There was a  branch to Newmarket from Banteer with an intermediate station at Kanturk.  The line opened on 1 April 1889 which closed to passengers on 27 January 1947 and completely on 1 January 1963, though other sources say 4 February 1963.

Valentia

Rail Air Link

References

Railway lines in Ireland